Meterana badia is a species of moth in the family Noctuidae. This species is endemic to New Zealand.

Taxonomy
This species was first described by Alfred Philpott in 1927 using a male specimen collected by himself at Leslie Valley, Mount Arthur in November and named Melanchra badia. In 1988 J. S. Dugdale placed this species in the genus Meterana. In the same publication Dugdale synonymises Melanchra meridiana with this species. The male holotype specimen is held in the New Zealand Arthropod Collection.

Description
Philpott described this species as follows:

Distribution
This species is endemic to New Zealand.

References

Noctuinae
Moths of New Zealand
Endemic fauna of New Zealand
Moths described in 1927
Taxa named by Alfred Philpott
Endemic moths of New Zealand